Brenz may refer to:

Brenz (river), a river in southern Germany
Brenz an der Brenz, a village in Baden-Württemberg, Germany
Brenz, Mecklenburg-Vorpommern, a municipality in Mecklenburg-Vorpommern, Germany
Johannes Brenz, a 16th-century German theologian